Tioughnioga may refer to:

Tioughnioga River, a tributary of the Chenango River, with two branches that converge at Cortland, New York, and flow south from there
Givetian, also known as Tioughniogan or Tioughnioga stage, the middle stage of the Middle Devonian period